International Marine Passenger Terminal is a cruise ship passenger terminal located in the Port of Toronto at 8 Unwin Avenue in Port Lands, Toronto, Ontario, Canada. The facility is operated by PortsToronto.

History 
The terminal was opened in 2005. It was originally built to accommodate The Spirit of Ontario I, a water-jet powered big catamaran fast ferry that was to make several round trips per day between Toronto, Ontario and Rochester, New York, but the ferry service only ran for a total of six months. The Rochester firm that owned and operated the ferry had a 14-year lease on the use of the terminal that would have paid the City of Toronto $250,000 per year. The lease was terminated in December 2009 after payment of a $90,000 settlement.

Since the demise of the fast ferry service, PortsToronto has been promoting Toronto as a cruise ship destination. Cruise ships that serve American and European tourists travelling on the Great Lakes between May and October are making increasing use of the terminal as a port of call over the summer months. Indeed cruise passenger volumes at a variety of Great Lakes ports, which cumulatively had 100,000 passengers in 2018, increased between 2015 and 2019 reflecting increased touring on the Great Lakes.

Terminal building 
The terminal is a two-storey building which has  of floor space and can deploy an adjustable passenger ramp from the second storey. The terminal building is also regularly used as a film location. For its three years in production the CBC drama The Border used the customs facilities of the terminal as the headquarters of an elite customs and border squad. Renting the terminal for filming costs $3,500 per day.

Traffic 
Cruise ships that have made multiple ports of call over the last few years include the 420 passenger MS Hamburg, the 180 passenger MV Le Champlain and the 210 passenger MV Victory I. On October 14, 2019 the terminal processed a record 988 people when the Hamburg, the Le Champlain and their passengers and crew docked on the same day.

References 

Buildings and structures completed in 2005
Buildings and structures in Toronto
Water transport in Toronto
Ferry terminals in Canada
Transport buildings and structures in Ontario
2005 establishments in Ontario